(born December 28, 1949) is the pen name of , a popular contemporary Japanese writer, mainly of short stories.

Biography
Kitamura was born in the town of Sugito in Saitama Prefecture.  He studied literature at Waseda University in Tokyo, and was a member of the Waseda Mystery Club while a student there.  However, after graduating from Waseda in 1972, he returned to Saitama to become a language teacher at Kasukabe High School, his alma mater.  He began his fiction writing career only after teaching for almost twenty years, and stopped teaching in 1993 to devote himself completely to writing once established as an author.

He made his writing debut using a pen name.  Initially, because the unnamed first-person protagonist of his early works was a female college student, and the name Kaoru is gender ambiguous, it was widely speculated that Kitamura was female. This speculation persisted until he revealed his identity upon accepting the Mystery Writers of Japan Award in 1991.

Works
Kitamura is known as a writer of mysteries, and rather than the detective and crime stories of traditional mystery, his work mainly focuses on the logical resolution of more "ordinary" puzzles and questions encountered in everyday life.  He is considered a pioneer of this style of mystery in Japan, called , which has since been taken up by many other writers.

His works have been adapted for film, television, and manga.

Selected bibliography

See also 

 Honkaku Mystery Writers Club of Japan

References
   (Includes a brief English biography of Kitamura)

External links
 J'Lit | Authors : Kaoru Kitamura | Books from Japan
 夜の蝉　(yoru no semi): Night Locust by Kaoru Kitamura
 Turn (JAPAN 2001) English language review of film adaption of Turn
 http://www.kitamura-tei.com Japanese language fan site

1949 births
Naoki Prize winners
Japanese mystery writers
Mystery Writers of Japan Award winners
Honkaku Mystery Award winners
Japanese male short story writers
Living people
Waseda University alumni
Writers from Saitama Prefecture